Events of 2023 in Fiji.

Incumbents

Government of Fiji 

 President: Wiliame Katonivere
 Prime Minister: Sitiveni Rabuka
 Speaker: Naiqama Lalabalavu

Cabinet of Fiji

Events 
Ongoing – COVID-19 pandemic in Fiji
Scheduled

 2023 Super Rugby Pacific season

See also 

2022–23 South Pacific cyclone season
2023 Pacific typhoon season

References 

 
Fiji
Fiji
2020s in Fiji
Years of the 21st century in Fiji